Zatrephes lentiginosus is a moth in the family Erebidae. It was described by Walter Rothschild in 1917. It is found in French Guiana.

References

Phaegopterina
Moths described in 1917